The Central Guidance Commission on Building Spiritual Civilization (CGCBSC), officially known as the Central Commission for Guiding Cultural and Ethical Progress, is a commission of the Central Committee of the Chinese Communist Party. It is tasked with educational efforts to build a "spiritual civilization" (Jingshen Wenming) based on socialism and the goal to build a socialist harmonious society, according to the official Chinese Communist Party (CCP) policy.

The commission was established on April 21, 1997. As one of the most important ideological steering bodies of the CCP and the People's Republic of China, it controls nationwide propaganda and ideological dissemination, overlapping another similar body, the Leading Group for Propaganda and Ideological Work. Both the Commission and the Leading Group are chaired by the Politburo Standing Committee responsible for propaganda, and overrules the CCP Propaganda Department.

Currently, Wang Huning serves as chairman, and Huang Kunming is the vice-chair.

Chairmen 

 Ding Guangen (1997–2002)
 Li Changchun (2002–2013)
 Liu Yunshan (2013–2017)
 Wang Huning (2017–present)

References

Citations

Sources 

 Xu Dashen, Records of the People's Republic of China, Jilin People's Publishing House, 1994.

Institutions of the Central Committee of the Chinese Communist Party
1997 establishments in China
Organizations established in 1997